Aliculastrum is a genus of small sea snails or bubble snails, marine opisthobranch gastropod molluscs in the family Haminoeidae.

This genus was originally considered to be a subgenus of Atys.

Life habits
These bubble snails are herbivores; they live on plant or algal substrates.

Species
Species in the genus Aliculastrum include:
 Aliculastrum attenuatum
 Aliculastrum cylindricum (Helbling, 1779) - Cylindrical atys, cylindrical true bubble, silkworm shell, Distribution : Indo-West Pacific, Length: 10 to 30 mm
 Aliculastrum debile (Pease, 1860)
 Aliculastrum exaratum (Carpenter, 1857)
 Aliculastrum extensum
 Aliculastrum ooformis (Habe, 1964)
 Aliculastrum parallelum (Gould, 1847)
 Aliculastrum secalinum (A. Adams, 1862)
 Aliculastrum solidum (Bruguière, 1792)
 Aliculastrum tumidum (Burn, 1978)
 Aliculastrum volvulina (A. Adams, 1862)

References

External links
  Ehrenberg C.G. (1828-1831). Animalia evertebrata exclusis Insectis. Series prima. In: F.G. Hemprich & C.G. Ehrenberg, Symbolae physicae, seu icones et descriptiones Mammalium, Avium, Insectorum et animalia evertebra, quae ex itinere per Africam borealem et Asiam occidentalem studio nova aut illustrata redierunt. 126 pp. (1831), 10 pls (1828)
 Pilsbry H.A. (1895-1896). Manual of conchology, structural and systematic, with illustrations of the species. (1)16: Philinidae, Gastropteridae, Aglajidae, Aplysiidae, Oxynoeidae, Runcinidae, Umbraculidae, Pleurobranchidae, pp. i-vii [1896, 1-112 [1895], 113-262 [1896], pl. 1-31 [1895], 32-74 [1896]. Philadelphia, Conchological Section, Academy of Natural Sciences]
  Too, C. C.; Carlson, C.; Hoff, P. J.; Malaquias, M. A. E. (2014). Diversity and systematics of Haminoeidae gastropods (Heterobranchia: Cephalaspidea) in the tropical West Pacific Ocean: new data on the genera Aliculastrum, Atys, Diniatys and Liloa. Zootaxa. 3794 (3): 355–392
 https://doi.org/10.1071/is18051

Haminoeidae
Gastropod genera